Voskresensk is the name of several inhabited localities in Russia.

Modern localities
Urban localities
Voskresensk, Moscow Oblast, a town in Voskresensky District of Moscow Oblast

Rural localities
Voskresensk, Kaluga Oblast, a selo in Kirovsky District of Kaluga Oblast
Voskresensk, Perm Krai, a selo in Karagaysky District of Perm Krai

Renamed localities
Voskresensk, the name of the town of Istra, Moscow Oblast before 1930

Alternative names
Voskresensk, alternative name of Voskresenovka, a selo in Voskresenovsky Selsoviet of Limansky District in Astrakhan Oblast; 
Voskresensk, alternative name of Voskresenskoye, a village in Khvalovskoye Settlement Municipal Formation of Volkhovsky District in Leningrad Oblast;